Mousa Mohammed Abu Marzook (born 9 January 1951) is a Palestinian senior member of Hamas.

Early life and education
Marzook's parents were from Yibna, Mandatory Palestine (now Yavne, Israel). They became refugees after the 1948 Arab–Israeli War and were forced to move to the Rafah camp in the Gaza Strip. Marzook was born there on 9 January 1951. He completed high school in Gaza, studied engineering in Cairo until 1976, and then looked for work in the Persian Gulf. He continued his studies in the U.S. obtaining a master's degree in construction management from Colorado State University and a doctorate in industrial engineering from Louisiana Tech.

Hamas involvement
Marzook has been active in the Islamic political work since 1968, Marzook played a significant role in reorganizing Hamas after the mass arrest of its members in 1989. Israeli journalist Shlomi Eldar credits Abu Marzook's fundraising prowess, and his connections to donors in Europe and the US with saving the organization and developing its infrastructure in Gaza, including social service programs. Israel claims that some funds were used for attacks against Israel, a charge that Abu Marzouk denies. Abu Marzook was elected as the first Hamas political bureau chief in 1992, and since 1997 has been deputy chairman of the Hamas Political Bureau. Marzook founded the Islamic Association of Palestine.

Exile
Marzook lived in Jordan from 1998 to 2001. He then moved to Damascus, Syria in 2001. As of 2012, Marzook lives in New Cairo, Egypt.

Arrest
In the mid-1990s Marzook was arrested in JFK airport in the US, although no formal charges placed against him. Two months after his detainment, Israel filed a request for the United States to extradite him. Represented by Stanley L. Cohen, he spent the following 2 years fighting his case in the court system, but the final decision was for his extradition, after which Israel dropped its extradition request. With no formal charges against him the United States released him, but not wanting him to remain, the United States contacted numerous Arab countries to allow Marzook residency. All refused, except Jordan, which reportedly agreed under U.S. pressure.  Cohen continues to legally represent Marzook.

Criminal charges in the US
Marzook was listed as a Specially Designated Terrorist by the U.S. Treasury Department in 1995, and is currently on the renamed Treasury department Specially Designated National list under such alternative spellings of his name as Dr. Musa Abu-Marzuq, Sa'id Abu-Marzuq, Mousa Mohamed Abou Marzook, Musa Abu Marzouk, and Musa Abu Marzuk, and under the alias "Abu-'Umar."

In 2002, a federal grand jury in Dallas returned an indictment against Marzook for conspiring to violate U.S. laws that prohibit dealings in terrorist funds. The indictment alleged that Marzook had conspired with the Richardson, Texas-based InfoCom Corporation and five of its employees to hide his financial transactions with the computer company. He allegedly invested $250,000 in InfoCom, with Infocom to make payments to Marzook based on the company's net profits or losses.

In 2004 Ismail Elbarasse was detained by police in Maryland west of the Chesapeake Bay Bridge after Baltimore County police officers said they saw a woman (his wife) in the vehicle videotaping the Bridge, including footage of the cables and upper supports of the main span. Elbarasse was an assistant to Mousa Mohammed Abu Marzook, and was named an unindicted co-conspirator by a grand jury in Chicago after authorities searched the home and vehicle of Elbarasse and found bank records belonging to Marzook, deputy chief of Hamas's political wing. A federal indictment charged Marzook in an alleged conspiracy that authorities said raised millions of dollars for Hamas.

In 2004, a U.S. court indicted him in absentia for coordinating and financing Hamas activities.

Interview with The Forward
In April 2012, Marzook gave what was billed as his "first-ever interview with a Jewish publication", The Forward. Marzook said that an agreement between Israel and the P.A. would have to be ratified by a referendum of all Palestinians, including those in Gaza. He would regard it as a hudna, or cease-fire, rather than as a peace treaty. If Hamas gained power, they would feel free to change provisions of the agreement. "We will not recognize Israel as a state", he said. "It will be like the relationship between Lebanon and Israel or Syria and Israel", that is, an armed truce.

The Forward requested the interview, which took place over two days at Marzook's home in New Cairo, Egypt. The Forward published responses to the interview from eight "prominent observers of the Middle East peace process", Laura Kam of The Israel Project, Israeli security analyst Yossi Alpher, Lara Friedman of Americans for Peace Now, Princeton University Professor Daoud Kuttab, Abraham Foxman of the Anti-Defamation League, Arab-American activist Hussein Ibish, David Keyes of Advancing Human Rights and political scientist Nathan Brown.

Operation Pillar of Defense 
Following the eight-day cross-border battle between Israel and Hamas in November, 2012, Moussa Abu Marzouk said that Hamas would not stop making weapons in Gaza or smuggling them to the territory. According to the Associated Press, Moussa Abu Marzouk is the No 2 leader in Hamas.

Notes and references

Citations

Sources

External links
 "Al-Jazeera interview with Mousa Abu Marzouq during Operation Cast Lead"
 
 Abu Marzook, Mousa "Hamas is ready to talk", The Guardian. Retrieved on 16-8-2007.
 Abu Marzook, Mousa "Hamas' stand", L.A. Times. Retrieved on 28-8-2008.
 Abu Marzook, Mousa "What Hamas Is Seeking", The Washington Post. Retrieved on 28-08-2008.
 Your Questions to Hamas: Live Chat with Mousa Abu Marzook @ IslamOnline.net

1951 births
Living people
People from Rafah Governorate
Palestinian Sunni Muslims
Hamas members
Funding of terrorism
Fugitives wanted by the United States
People deported from the United States
Colorado State University alumni
Louisiana Tech University alumni